is a Japanese tabletop role-playing game created by Group SNE. 10 million copies of the related books including rulebooks, novels and replays have been sold. The game was first published in 1989; the updated edition, known as the "Sword World 2.0", was published in 2008; the current edition "Sword World 2.5" was published in 2018.

Sword World RPG's system was given the name 2d6 System in 2003. Scrapped Princess RPG and Dragon Half RPG's system are also 2d6 System, though the games are only partially compatible.

Sword World RPG (original edition)

System
Sword World RPG's classes are called . Each ginou is a package of skills for that class. It is considered a hybrid system between a class-based system and a skill-based system, and is often called a class-skill system.

There are eight classes (Bard, Fighter, Priest, Ranger, Sage, Shaman, Sorcerer and Thief) for player characters and two classes (Dark Priest and Dragon Priest) exclusive to non-player characters. Five major races (Human, Dwarf, Elf, Half-Elf and GrassRunner) can become PCs. GrassRunners are a diminutive race similar to a hobbit or halfling.

The game uses only two 6-sided dice, as other polyhedral dice aren't common in Japan. Each 2d6 dice roll is translated into a more wide range of random numbers by using a rating table. The rating table is used for damage rolls, damage reduction rolls and such. An excerpt of the rating table follows.

Key number is equal to weapon/armor's requirement strength, or power of spell. Heavier weapon/armor is stronger.

Setting
Sword World's setting, Forcelia, includes Lodoss Island (of Record of Lodoss War) and the continent of Crystania (of Legend of Crystania). However, the largest continent, Alecrast (where Rune Soldier takes place) is the main setting. Forcelia is a typical fantasy world heavily influenced by games such as Dungeons & Dragons and RuneQuest. For instance, the GrassRunner race is similar to D&D's Halfling and several magic systems (spirit magic, sorcery and divine magic) are similar to RuneQuest's.

Rune Soldier is Sword World RPG's novel and anime series. Over a hundred light novels or replays (session logs) have been published.

Magic systems
All magic systems in Forcelia are called  based upon belief in the power of words. Each magic system has a proper language system as follow, and the language has magic power in itself.

 - Every character can use common magic (weaker cantrip of High Ancient sorcery) by the use of commercial magic devices and the chant of the keyword in common language.
 - Songs with lyrics in the ancient language of High Ancient sorcery.

Sword World 2.0/2.5

The new edition Sword World 2.0 (SW2.0 for short) was released in April 2008 and revised in 2012. In 2018 Sword World 2.5 (SW2.5) was launched.

System
There are 15 classes (Bard, Conjurer, Enhancer, Fairy Tamer, Fencer, Fighter, Grappler, Magi-tech, Priest, Ranger, Rider, Sage, Scout, Marksman and Sorcerer). It uses only two 6-sided dice as with the previous edition.

Setting
It has a new campaign setting named Raxia.  There are 8 races (Human, Dwarf, Elf, Rune-folk, Tabbit, Nightmare, Lilldraken and GrassRunner) in the rulebooks #1-3.

Original races in Raxia
Tabbit - A bipedal rabbit race who are travelling around the world.
Rune-folk - An artificial humanoid race who have a desire to serve the other races by instinct.
Nightmare - They are mutants of other races and are born with the gift of both fighting and magic. However, because it is believed that their souls are distorted and polluted, Nightmares are looked at askance.
Lilldraken - A race of bipedal dragon-folk who like commerce and peddlery.

Replays
Group SNE pioneered a new book genre called replay. Replays are RPG session logs arranged for reading, similar in style to light novels. The first replay, Record of Lodoss War, is a replay of Dungeons & Dragons. From that time, replays became popular in Japan, and not only with RPG gamers. Several characters and parties in replays are as popular as characters of anime (for example, the beautiful female elf Deedlit in Record of Lodoss War, who was played by the male science fiction novelist Hiroshi Yamamoto).

Sword World replays are popular, too: about 10 series and over 40 books of original Sword World replays were published until 2008. Since 2008, more than 30 series and over 80 books of Sword World 2.0 replays were published, as of 2016 September.

Video games
There have been three role-playing video games released by T&E Soft officially based on Sword World. These were Sword World PC for the NEC PC-9801 in 1992, Sword World SFC for the Super Famicom in 1993, and Sword World SFC 2: Inishie no Kyojin Densetsu for the Super Famicom in 1994.

In 2009, Sword World 2.0 was released for the Nintendo DS handheld game console as a role-playing visual novel adventure game that attempts to simulate the full experience of playing a tabletop RPG. The game features branching plot paths and multiple endings, as well as virtual dice rolls that partially determine the events, character parameters, and enemy encounters.

External links
 Official Website of Sword World 2.0/2.5

References

Japanese role-playing games
Fantasy role-playing games
Record of Lodoss War
Kadokawa Dwango franchises
Role-playing games introduced in 1989